Jonas Ivanauskas (born 1960 in Alytus) was a Lithuanian clergyman and bishop for the Roman Catholic Diocese of Kaišiadorys. He was ordained in 1985. He was appointed bishop in 2012.

References 

1960 births
2012 deaths
Lithuanian Roman Catholic bishops
People from Alytus